Ctenidium is a genus of mosses belonging to the family Hypnaceae.

The genus was first described by Wilhelm Philippe Schimper.

The genus has cosmopolitan distribution.

Species:
 Ctenidium molluscum Mitten, 1869

References

Hypnaceae
Moss genera